Robert A. Prior (September 18, 1891 – death unknown) was an American Negro league pitcher in the 1910s. 

A native of Scipio, Indiana, Prior made his Negro leagues debut for the Chicago Union Giants in 1914. He finished his career with the St. Louis Giants in 1916 and 1917.

References

External links
  and Seamheads

1891 births
Place of death missing
Year of death missing
St. Louis Giants players
Baseball pitchers